Mynavathi (26 July 1935 – 10 November 2012) was an Indian actress. She made her first screen appearance as an actor in the 1955 Kannada film Santa Sakhu and acted in over 100 Kannada films. She was the younger sister of another popular Kannada actress Pandari Bai. She became popular after her role in the 1959 Kannada film Abba Aa Hudugi, which co-starred Rajkumar and her sister Pandari Bai and was directed by H. L. N. Simha. In the film, she played the role of an autocratic girl who hates men. It was based on William Shakespeare's play The Taming of the Shrew.

Career 
After her debut in 1955, Mynavathi appeared in Bhakta Vijaya, Hari Bhakta and Rayara Sose, all the films that had Rajkumar playing the lead role. She has acted alongside other greats of Kannada cinema like Kalyan Kumar and Udaykumar, with Sivaji Ganesan in Tamil films. Her other popular films include Kacha Devayani, Naane Bhagyavathi, Anuraadha, Annapurna, Sarvajnamurthy, Amma, Muthaide Bhagya and Obbarigintha Obbaru. Launching "Yantra Media" in the 1980s with her sons, Mynavathi entered the television industry. She has acted in the television serials Amma, Manetana, Mahayagna and Sumangali.

Death 
Mynavathi died on 10 November 2012 at the BGS Global Hospital, Bangalore from cardiac arrest.

Filmography

Kannada

Tamil

Bengali

References 

1935 births
2012 deaths
Actresses in Kannada cinema
Indian film actresses
Actresses in Tamil cinema
People from Uttara Kannada
Actresses from Karnataka
20th-century Indian actresses